Miguel Martín Fernández (born 1 October 1997) is a Spanish professional footballer who plays for Motril as a forward.

Club career
Born in Motril, Granada, Andalusia, Martín finished his formation with Sevilla FC. He made his senior debut with the C-team on 27 August 2016, starting and scoring the first in a 3–3 Tercera División away draw against CD San Roque de Lepe.

On 22 October 2017, Martín scored a brace in a 2–0 home win against CD Cabecense, taking his tally up to seven goals in only ten matches during the campaign. He made his professional debut with the reserves on 10 December 2017, coming on as a second-half substitute for David Carmona in a 1–2 away loss against Gimnàstic de Tarragona in the Segunda División.

Martín left Sevilla on 16 July 2019, signing for fourth-tier Real Jaén.

References

External links

1997 births
Living people
People from Motril
Sportspeople from the Province of Granada
Spanish footballers
Footballers from Andalusia
Association football forwards
Segunda División players
Segunda División B players
Tercera División players
Sevilla FC C players
Sevilla Atlético players
Real Jaén footballers